The United Autonomous Unions of Madagascar (USAM) is a national trade union center in Madagascar. It is affiliated with the International Trade Union Confederation.

References

Trade unions in Madagascar
International Trade Union Confederation